The Eastern Andes Metamorphic Complex is a large coherent but varied group of metamorphic and sedimentary rocks –in other words a geologic complex– that crops out in the eastern Patagonian Andes in Chile and Argentina. The metamorphic grade of rocks varies but does not exceed greenschist facies, the only exception to this are rocks near plutons affected by contact metamorphism. The sedimentary protoliths sedimented in the Late Paleozoic. The pressures and temperatures of metamorphism of the Eastern Andes Metamorphic Complex are different those usually expected from accretionary complexes. The sedimentary protoliths of the Eastern Andes Metamorphic Complex were likely deposited in a passive continental margin.

Cordillera Darwin Metamorphic Complex shows affinity with the Eastern Andes Metamorphic Complex albeit both complexes lie hundreds of kilometers from each other.

References

Geology of Aysén Region
Geology of Magallanes Region
Geology of Santa Cruz Province, Argentina
Metamorphic complexes
Lithodemic units of Argentina
Lithodemic units of Chile